"I Love America" is a 1978 disco hit by Swiss singer Patrick Juvet. Along with the tracks, "Where Is My Woman" and "Got A Feeling", it peaked at number five on the disco chart in the United States. It was included in the compilation album, A Night at Studio 54, in 1979.

In 1996, "I Love America" was sampled for Full Intention's dance hit "America (I Love America)".

Charts

References

1978 singles
Disco songs
1978 songs
Songs about the United States
Patrick Juvet songs